Niomi Arleen McLean-Daley  (born 26 April 1981), better known as Ms. Dynamite, is a British singer and rapper. She is the recipient of the Mercury Music Prize, two Brit Awards and three MOBO Awards.

Early years 
She was born Niomi Arleen McLean-Daley and raised in Kentish Town, North London to a Jamaican father and a Scottish mother. She is the older sister of the rapper Akala.

Career

2001–2004: A Little Deeper 
Ms. Dynamite (originally Lady Dynamite) was first known for her vocals on the UK garage underground track "Booo!", which was regularly played on London pirate radio stations and was later released as a single. While working at the radio station RAW FM, Ms. Dynamite was discovered by Richard Forbes ("DJ Sticky") at a West End club. Interest grew from all major British labels and eventually she was signed via her management Bigga Beats to Polydor Records, where she met producer Salaam Remi, who cultivated her talent.

She released her debut album, A Little Deeper, in 2002, which featured hit songs "It Takes More" and "Dy-Na-Mi-Tee". In 2003, the album was released in the United States to critical acclaim. In 2002, Dynamite won the prestigious Mercury Music Prize, for A Little Deeper. She donated the £20,000 prize to the NSPCC.

On 8 March 2003, Ms. Dynamite was the musical guest on Saturday Night Live, hosted by Queen Latifah.

Also in 2003, Ms. Dynamite signed a deal to promote Pepsi, reported to be worth £1m 

She performed at the closing ceremony of the 2002 Commonwealth Games at the City of Manchester Stadium. On 2 July 2005, she performed at the Live 8 concert in Hyde Park, London. Among the songs performed was "Redemption Song" written by Bob Marley, which she performed alongside her brother, Akala.

2005–2006: Judgement Days 

On 11 September 2005, she returned to the limelight (having taken time off to have her son, Shavaar) with a new album titled Judgement Days. Featuring more social commentary, in songs such as the first double A-side single, "Judgement Day"/"Father" and the Tony Blair critique, "Mr Prime Minister," reviews of the album were not as favourable as those of her debut. However, "Judgement Day" reached No. 25 in the UK Singles Chart.

In 2006, she was convicted of assaulting a police officer and was sentenced to 60 hours community service.

2007–present: Hiatus and career wind-down 
After taking a break from the music scene, Dynamite guest-hosted BBC Radio 1Xtra, and stated she would be releasing a third album, Democracy, in 2009, with the first single from the new album being "Bad Gyal". However, this was later pushed back as she concentrated on other projects and motherhood. Meanwhile, she appeared on Hell's Kitchen on ITV1 in 2009, finishing fourth, and later as an expert adviser on Goldie's Band: By Royal Appointment on BBC Two.

Since then, she has appeared on several collaborations, notably Katy B's second single, "Lights On", which peaked at number 4 in the UK Singles Chart in 2010, and the Magnetic Man track "Fire", which appeared on their debut album.

A single, "Neva Soft" (produced by Labrinth), was released in 2011, although the promised album did not appear. Since then she has been the featured vocalist on the DJ Fresh Versus Jay Fray track "Dibby Dibby Sound" (February 2013) and a David Guetta and Showtek song for the former's 2014 album Listen, "No Money No Love" along with Elliphant.

In 2020 Ms. Dynamite appeared on Drum n Bass artist, CLIPZ (Redlight (musician)), single "Again" which also featured Ms Banks along with JayKae.

Discography 

Studio albums
 A Little Deeper (2002)
 Judgement Days (2005)
Mixtapes
 A Little Darker (with Akala) (2006)

Soundtracks 
 "Dy-Na-Mi-Tee" (FIFA 2003 soundtrack)
 "Dy-Na-Mi-Te" (Ali G Indahouse soundtrack)
 "Dy-Na-Mi-Te" (My Scene Barbie Mix)
 "Krazy Krush" (Misfits Channel 4 soundtrack)

Awards and nominations 

Ms. Dynamite was appointed Member of the Order of the British Empire (MBE) in the 2018 Birthday Honours for services to music.

References

External links 

1981 births
Living people
Anglo-Scots
21st-century Black British women singers
Black British women rappers
Brit Award winners
British hip hop singers
English people of Jamaican descent
English people of Scottish descent
British contemporary R&B singers
English women singer-songwriters
People from Crawley
People from Archway, London
Rappers from London
Singers from London
UK garage singers
BBC Radio 1Xtra presenters
Polydor Records artists
Relentless Records artists
Members of the Order of the British Empire
British women radio presenters